Samuel J. Thayer (born 1976- ) is an American  wild food forager and author.     Thayer is a self-taught natural historian. In 2001, Thayer founded Forager's Harvest, and acts as editor and director of the institute.

Early life and education 
Born in Wausau, Wisconsin, to Richard and Ellen Thayer, he was raised in Madison and graduated from Madison East High School in 1994. He has one brother and two sisters.

Books

Thayer has published three books: The Forager's Harvest: A Guide to Identifying, Harvesting, and Preparing Edible Wild Plants; Nature's Garden: A Guide to Identifying, Harvesting, and Preparing Edible Wild Plants and Incredible Wild Edibles: 36 Plants That Can Change Your Life. All of them self-published by The Foragers Harvest

Awards

He has won three awards for his book Nature's Garden: A Guide to Identifying, Harvesting, and Preparing Edible Wild Plants First Place for the 2006 Midwest Book Awards in the category "Nature"; First Place for the  2010 Midwest Book Awards, Midwest Independent Publisher's Association, and second place in the category "Gardening/Agriculture" for The 2011 Benjamin Franklin Award;

References

1976 births
Writers from Wisconsin
American food writers
American nature writers
American non-fiction outdoors writers
21st-century American non-fiction writers
21st-century American male writers
American male non-fiction writers
Living people